CFMY-FM is a Canadian radio station that broadcasts a hot adult contemporary format at 96.1 FM in Medicine Hat, Alberta. The station is branded as My96 and is owned by the Jim Pattison Group.

History
The station originally began broadcasting as CJCY at 1390 AM in 1982, until it moved to its current frequency in 1998.

References

External links
My96
 

Fmy
Fmy
Fmy
Radio stations established in 1982
1982 establishments in Alberta